Petr Sailer (born September 18, 1975) is a Czech professional ice hockey player. He played with HC Karlovy Vary in the Czech Extraliga during the 2010–11 Czech Extraliga season.

Sailer previously played for HC České Budějovice, HC Slavia Praha and HC Bílí Tygři Liberec.

References

External links 
 
 

1975 births
Czech ice hockey forwards
HC Karlovy Vary players
Motor České Budějovice players
HC Bílí Tygři Liberec players
HC Slavia Praha players
Living people
People from Jindřichův Hradec
Sportspeople from the South Bohemian Region
KLH Vajgar Jindřichův Hradec players